The first lady of the Republic of Botswana is the wife of the president of Botswana. The current first lady is Neo Masisi, the wife of President Mokgweetsi Masisi.

The role is largely ceremonial and has no salary. President Masisi has said that his wife does not have the remit to influence government policies.

History
There was no first lady from 1 April 2008 to 1 April 2018, as President Ian Khama was unmarried. The absence of a first lady was problematic for some official functions, and there were moves to find a substitute for some occasions. President Kharma's unmarried status was controversial because of the requirements of tribal traditions.

First ladies of Botswana

See also
 List of heads of state of Botswana

References

Botswana
Politics of Botswana
Presidents of Botswana
Lists of political office-holders in Botswana